Suranjith Dharmasena (born 26 December 1965) is a Sri Lankan cricketer who played for Tamil Union Cricket and Athletic Club. He played in twenty-eight first-class and five List A matches between 1989 and 1993.

Early life
Dharmasena was born in Colombo in 1965. His mother, Sopahia ( Marasinghe) represented Ceylon in volleyball and netball. Suranjith and his brother Kishan both attended Thurstan College, where Suranjith was cricket captain in 1984.

Playing career
Dharmasena played in Sri Lankan domestic cricket for Tamil Union Cricket and Athletic Club, making his first-class cricket debut in 1989. His Sri Lankan cricket career was cut short when, in 1993, he moved to the United Arab Emirates (UAE) to work as a banker. His career continued in the UAE, where he was a prolific batsman in club cricket.

In February 2020, he was named in Sri Lanka's squad for the Over-50s Cricket World Cup in South Africa. However, the tournament was cancelled during the third round of matches due to the COVID-19 pandemic. He was later stranded in South Africa due to the lockdown in the country and no flights being available.

References

External links
 

1965 births
Living people
Sri Lankan cricketers
Tamil Union Cricket and Athletic Club cricketers
Wayamba cricketers
Place of birth missing (living people)